This is a list of Transport for London (TfL) contracted bus routes in London, England, as well as commercial services that enter the Greater London area (except coaches).

Bus services in London are operated by Abellio London, Arriva London, Go-Ahead London (Blue Triangle, Docklands Buses, London Central and  London General), Metroline, RATP Dev Transit London (London Sovereign, London United and London Transit), Stagecoach London (East London, Selkent and Thameside), Sullivan Buses and Uno. TfL-sponsored operators run more than 500 services.

Non-TfL-sponsored operators include Arriva Shires & Essex, Arriva Southern Counties, Carousel Buses, Diamond South East, Go-Coach, First Berkshire & The Thames Valley, Metrobus, Southdown PSV, Stagecoach South and Trustybus.

Classification of route numbers
In Victorian times, passengers could recognise the owner and the route of an omnibus (Latin: "for everyone") only by its livery and its line name, with painted signs on the sides showing the two termini to indicate the route. Then, in 1906, George Samuel Dicks of the London Motor Omnibus Company decided that, as the line name 'Vanguard' had proved to be very popular, he would name all lines 'Vanguard' and number the company's five routes 1 through to 5. Other operators soon saw the advantage, in that a unique route number was easier for the travelling public to remember, and so the practice of using route numbers soon spread.

Historic classification

Bus routes run by London Transport were grouped as follows.

The London Traffic Act 1924 imposed numbering known as the Bassom Scheme, named after Superintendent (later Chief Constable) Arthur Ernest Bassom of the Metropolitan Police who devised it. For many decades, variant and short workings used letter suffixes (e.g. "77B"). The numbers reflected the company that operated the route.

The numbering was revised in 1934 after London Transport was formed:

Current classification

List of routes
All routes operate in both directions unless detailed.

1–99

100–199

200–299

300–399

400–499

500–599

600–699
The majority of buses numbered between 600 and 699 are school services, running once on each weekday peak period during school term time. The exception to this is route 607, a limited stop express route.

900–999

Route numbers from 900 to 999 represent Mobility Buses; these provide a once-a-week return journey to a local shopping centre from relatively low-density neighbourhoods where there is no alternative route in the main bus network. The number of Mobility Buses routes has declined because low-floor and wheelchair-accessible buses run on all London Buses routes.

Letter prefixes

Night only routes (N-prefixed)

Night bus routes are often related to the day numerical equivalent, normally running the same route but with an extension at either end of the service. This is normally to provide a night service to destinations served by tube or train during the day.

However, there are a few N-prefixed route numbers that have no relation to their daytime equivalents: the N5, N20, and N97 all operate in a different part of London to their respective day routes, and the N550 and N551 (which provide night service on parts of the DLR network) have no corresponding daytime routes.

There are also 24-hour routes, which run day and night but usually with a lower frequency during the night hours. The vast majority run the same route at all times. With the introduction of the Night Tube, some day routes have been extended to run during Friday and Saturday nights to serve the stations.

Non-TfL bus routes in Greater London
These bus routes are not contracted to TfL and are therefore not 'London Buses', all but three run from villages and towns outside Greater London to destinations within. They are painted in a colour chosen by the operator, so are not necessarily red like London Buses, and most of them do not accept Oyster cards. These routes are operated with a London Service Permit issued by TfL so they are recognised by TfL bus maps and appear on TfL bus stops.

Former routes

Planned routes

Temporary routes
There are three special TfL express routes which only run during the Notting Hill Carnival: 2X, 36X and 205X.

Route 23A operates on one day per year to Imber using heritage vehicles.

See also
 :Category: London bus operators

References

Bibliography
 Atkin, Michael. "THIS SCEPTRED ISLE", The Guardian 
 Carr, Ken, The London Bus Guide. Boreham: Visions International Entertainment, 2011. .

External links
 London Buses

 
London
Bus
Transport in Epsom and Ewell
Transport in Epping Forest District
Transport in Thurrock